Lærke Marie Olsen (born 21 June 1998) is a Danish judoka. She competed in the women's 63 kg event at the 2020 Summer Olympics held in Tokyo, Japan.

She is the silver medallist of the 2018 World Junior Championships in the -63 kg category. In June 2021, she competed in the women's 63 kg event at the 2021 World Judo Championships held in Budapest, Hungary.

References

External links
 

1998 births
Living people
Danish female judoka
People from Groesbeek
Judoka at the 2019 European Games
European Games competitors for Denmark
Judoka at the 2020 Summer Olympics
Olympic judoka of Denmark
Sportspeople from Gelderland
21st-century Danish women